The 2021–22 Telekom S-League was the 18th season of the Telekom S-League, the top football league in the Solomon Islands. It ended on 21st November 2021. Many games take place at the 22,000-capacity Lawson Tama Stadium.

The league started on 5 June 2021.

Teams
Twelve teams play the 2021 season, an increase from nine in the 2019–2020 season. 
Malaita Kingz F.C. last from the previous season did not enter, and was replaced by Waneagu United and Kula FC.

Central Coast (Honiara)
Henderson Eels (Honiara)
Honiara City (Honiara)
Vfresh Isabel United (Isabel Province) 
Kossa (Honiara)
 (Honiara)
Marist (Honiara)
Real Kakamora (Makira-Ulawa)
Solomon Warriors (Honiara)
Southern United (Honiara)
Waneagu United
Kula F.C.

Champions

League table

Top scorers

References

Solomon Islands S-League seasons
Solomon Islands
S-League